Andrew King (born 1957) is Professor of English Literature and Literary Studies at the University of Greenwich and, since 2019, President of the Victorian Popular Fiction Association. He specialises in nineteenth-century periodicals and popular fiction. He is founding co-editor of Victorian Popular Fictions, the organ of the Victorian Popular Fiction Association.

Early life

Born in Wales from mining and shop-keeping stock, he was encouraged to read Classics at University by his school, Porth County Grammar School for Boys. He did a degree in classical and medieval Latin at the University of Reading, followed by an MA in Medieval Studies at the same university. An abortive PhD in Medieval French in Cambridge meant that he went to teach English at the University of Catania, Sicily, where apart from returning to the UK to complete a PGCE and teach for a year in a secondary school, he spent most of the 1980s. In 1990 he married a British council officer and accompanied her on her postings for the 1990s, completing a second MA, this time in English at the University of Sussex, in 1992. In 2000 he completed a PhD in English at Birkbeck College, University of London.

Academic life

In 2003 Andrew obtained his first full-time academic post in the UK. Canterbury Christ Church University appointed him as a senior lecturer in the Media Department. In 2009, after a year's research fellowship at the University of Ghent, he was promoted to Reader in Print History. It was while at Canterbury Christ Church that he published his monograph on The London Journal, and edited two collections of primary sources with John Plunkett from Exeter University:  Victorian Print Media and Popular Print Media, 1820–1900

Later he guest edited three special numbers of learned journals, including one on Angels and Demons in Critical Survey, another (with Marysa Demoor of the Ghent University) on the V ictorian professions, the press and gender in Nineteenth-Century Gender Studies, while the third was on work and leisure  in Victorian Periodicals Review.

In May 2012 he was appointed Professor of English at the University of Greenwich.

Collections of essays he has since edited with colleagues comprise Ouida and Victorian Popular Culture (with Jane Jordan) and, with Alexis Easley and John Morton, the Routledge Handbook to Nineteenth-Century Periodicals and Newspapers and Researching the Nineteenth-Century Periodical Press: Case Studies. Both the latter won the  Robert and Vineta Colby Prize for the book published during the preceding year that most advances our understanding of the nineteenth-century British press.

He has also published a critical edition of The Massarenes, the last full-length novel by Ouida, and written a considerable number of articles, chapters and book reviews as listed on his staff profile page.

His latest research in periodicals derives from his discovery of the dearth of research on trade periodicals as mediated communications. This crystallised in 2016 into BLT19, a digitisation project centred on Victorian periodicals concerned with various aspects of work, and into the first real overview of Victorian trade and professional periodicals for   The Edinburgh History of the British and Irish Press, Volume 2, 2020, edited by David Finkelstein.

In 2019, he co-founded Victorian Popular Fictions, the organ of the Victorian Popular Fiction Association, of which he became Acting and then Elected President in 2019.

References

Living people
1957 births
Academics of the University of Greenwich
Alumni of the University of Reading
Treherbert